The following is a list of the North Dakota Supreme Court justices, split into their respective courts.

North Dakota Supreme Court justices

Supreme Court Justices
North Dakota